Kolpur is town and union council of Mastung District in the Balochistan province of Pakistan. It is located at 29°53'60N 67°7'60E and has an altitude of 2087 metres (6850 feet).

References

Populated places in Mastung District
Union councils of Balochistan, Pakistan